Stenotyla is a genus of orchids. It contains 9 known species, all native to Central America and southern Mexico.

Stenotyla estrellensis (Ames) P.A.Harding - Costa Rica
Stenotyla francoi Archila - Guatemala
Stenotyla helleri (Fowlie) P.A.Harding - Nicaragua
Stenotyla lankesteriana (Pupulin) Dressler - Costa Rica, Panama
Stenotyla lendyana (Rchb.f.) Dressler - Oaxaca, Chiapas, Guatemala, El Salvador, Honduras
Stenotyla maculata Archila - Guatemala
Stenotyla maxillaperta Archila - Guatemala
Stenotyla panamensis Pupulin - Panama
Stenotyla picta (Rchb.f.) Dressler - Costa Rica, Panama

See also 
 List of Orchidaceae genera

References

External links 

Orchids of North America
Zygopetalinae genera
Zygopetalinae